Clarence Raymond Garrett (March 6, 1891 – February 11, 1977) was a Major League Baseball pitcher who played for one season. Nicknamed "Laz", he pitched four games for the Cleveland Indians during the 1915 Cleveland Indians season. He went to school at West Liberty State College.

External links

1891 births
1977 deaths
Major League Baseball pitchers
Cleveland Indians players
Baseball players from West Virginia
West Liberty Hilltoppers baseball players
Madison Senators players
Mason City Claydiggers players
People from Wetzel County, West Virginia